Our Lady of Perpetual Help Church is a Roman Catholic church in Fulham, in the London Borough of Hammersmith and Fulham. The church was designed by Benedict Williamson, an architect who later became a Catholic priest. It is situated on Stephendale Road and the parish house is situated on Tynemouth Street.

Interior
Its soaring classical columns and Romanesque arches emphasizes the light and space of the church giving it a height and grandeur that make it look deceptively large. The church was built just after the discovery Tutankhamen’s tomb in Egypt, so there are interior details that reflect the fascination with Egyptian pictures from the time. The Stations of the Cross each have a meditation in their own right.

History
In 1914, a local lady lost her son in action in the First World War. In 1922, she bought the local rubbish tip and built the church of Our Lady there in the memory of her son. She presented a silver cup to the first baby baptized here and a suite of furniture to the first couple married. It has been a parish church ever since.

References

External links
 Parish website
 Diocese of Westminster site

Our Lady of Perpetual Help
Churches in the Roman Catholic Diocese of Westminster
Roman Catholic churches completed in 1922
20th-century Roman Catholic church buildings in the United Kingdom